Edmund Thomas may refer to:
Ted Thomas (judge) (Sir Edmund Walter Thomas, born 1934), New Zealand jurist
Edmund Thomas (Parliamentarian) (1633–1677), Welsh politician
Edmund Thomas (footballer), see UNCAF Nations Cup 2001 squads

See also
Edmond Thomas (born 1954), American businessman

Ted Thomas (disambiguation)